Alfonso Meléndez Arana (1927–2005) was a Puerto Rican painter.

Arana was a Puerto Rican artist born in New York City. When he was young, the family moved to San Sebastián, Puerto Rico where the young painter spent his youth. At age six, Arana made his first picture and presented it to his mother. His father, a businessman, did not want his son to become an artist. This caused a major rift between father and son.

As a young man, Arana studied art in Mexico at the Atelier de Jose Bardasano, at the Manhattan School of Arts in New York, the Académie Julian and L'Ecole des Beaux-Arts of Paris, and did post graduate work at the American University in Washington, D.C.

As an artist, Arana became known for his style of almond-shaped, hollow yet expressive eyes in a face without a skull and with a slightly oversized body. He is also well known for his use of light, sophisticated and almost transparent colors. Arana himself defines his style as  expressionism and mannerism. The artist once explained that his alive and expressive human figures do not have any skulls because "they are receptacles of the active things in the world as is God, nature, life, whatever we want."

His works are often unsettling for the degree of expression shown by his silent figures. Most initiates to his style might find his paintings to be disturbing. However, after an initial period, viewers of his paintings often find beauty within the figure's expressions.

Arana has exhibited his work in Tokyo, Paris, New York, Mexico City, Puerto Rico, and Spain. In 1986, he created the Fundación Francisco Arana, an organization dedicated to foster art in young people. Once a year, the Fundación gives an outstanding art student a scholarship to live and study in Paris.

Arana suffered Parkinson's disease for quite a few years and died of associated complications on November 18, 2005 in his house in Paris in the company of his wife Simone Christophe, and daughter Rosa Meléndez Ibarra.

Of his art, Arana said:

My figures have the elements of life and light.  That light that invades the body is the spiritual side of these beings  and I like painting in that spiritual space.  Each figure transcends life beyond real life and I feel the beings come from within me and then I, myself become part of their  world.  They are real to me, they are my friends.

Arana taught his daughter, Rosa Ibarra, who also went on to study and exhibit art in Paris, France.

See also
 List of Puerto Ricans

References

1927 births
2005 deaths
Deaths from Parkinson's disease
American artists of Mexican descent
Puerto Rican painters
American University alumni
Neurological disease deaths in Puerto Rico
Painters from New York City
20th-century American painters
American male painters
20th-century American male artists